Jaro may refer to:

Jaro, Iloilo City, a district of Iloilo City, Philippines
Jaro, Indonesia, a subdistrict in Tabalong Regency, South Kalimantan
Jaro, Leyte, a municipality in the province of Leyte, Philippines
Jaro Medien (Jaro Media), a German music company
JARO Records, an American subsidiary of Rank Records Ltd (UK)
Jaro–Winkler distance
FF Jaro, a Finnish football club
Killamanjaro, nicknamed Jaro, a Reggae sound system